

Women's 50m EAD Freestyle - Final

Women's 50m EAD Freestyle - Heats

Women's 50m EAD Freestyle - Heat 01

Women's 50m EAD Freestyle - Heat 02

50 metres EAD freestyle
2006 in women's swimming